William Richard George Stanley, 9th Earl of Derby (c. 1655 – 5 November 1702), styled Lord Strange from 1655 to 1672, was an English peer and politician.

Derby was the eldest son of Charles Stanley, 8th Earl of Derby, and Dorotha Helena Kirkhoven.

He succeeded his father in the earldom in 1672 and later served as Lord Lieutenant of Lancashire from 1676 to 1687 and again from 1688 to 1701 and of Cheshire from 1676 to 1687. In 1685, Derby petitioned the House of Lords for the restoration of some of the family estates that had been seized from his late father, including the manors of Hawarden, Bidston, and Broughton, Lancashire.

Following the Glorious Revolution in which King William III supplanted James II, Derby was ordered as Lord Lieutenant of Lancashire to call out the Lancashire Militia in 1689. He raised three regiments of foot and three troops of horse, and was appointed Colonel of the first regiment. However, his younger brother, James, a professional soldier, actually commanded the Lancashire Brigade during the campaign in Ireland.

Lord Derby married Lady Elizabeth Butler, daughter of Thomas Butler, Earl of Ossory, in 1673. His only son James Stanley, Lord Strange, predeceased him.

On his death on 5 November 1702, his junior title of Baron Strange fell into abeyance between his two daughters (it was later called out abeyance in favour of the eldest daughter, Henrietta). He was succeeded in the earldom by his younger brother James Stanley, 10th Earl of Derby. Lady Derby died on 5 July 1717.

Notes

References
 Burke's Peerage, Baronetage and Knightage, 100th Edn, London, 1953.
Kidd, Charles, Williamson, David (editors). Debrett's Peerage and Baronetage (1990 edition). New York: St Martin's Press, 1990, 
 Maj R.J.T. Williamson & Col J. Lawson Whalley, History of the Old County Regiment of Lancashire Militia, London: Simpkin, Marshall, 1888.

|-

|-

1650s births
1702 deaths
Lord-Lieutenants of Anglesey
Lord-Lieutenants of Caernarvonshire
Lord-Lieutenants of Cheshire
Lord-Lieutenants of Flintshire
Lord-Lieutenants of Denbighshire
Lord-Lieutenants of Lancashire
Lord-Lieutenants of Merionethshire
Lord-Lieutenants of Montgomeryshire
William
17th-century English nobility
18th-century English people
People of Byzantine descent
9
Monarchs of the Isle of Man
Barons Strange